The men's 500 meter at the 2010 KNSB Dutch Single Distance Championships took place in Heerenveen at the Thialf ice skating rink on 30 October – 1 November 2009. It consisted of twice 500 meter where the speed skaters started once in the inner and once in the outer lane. Although this tournament was held in 2009 it was part of the speed skating season 2009–2010. There were 24 participants.

Statistics

Result

Source:

Draw 1st 500 meter

Draw 2nd 500 meter

References

Single Distance Championships
2010 Single Distance